Acatlán Fútbol Club is a Mexican football club that plays in the Third Division. It is based in the city of Zapotlanejo.

History 
The team was created in 2016 after that the Vaqueros Bellavista left the town. 

In the 2017-2018 season, Acatlán finished as group champion. In the promotion playoffs, the team eliminated Troyanos UDEM, Tuzos UAZ, Club Hidalguense, Atlético Valladolid, Águilas UAS and C.D. Uruapan, to reach division final. In the final of the category, Acatlán faced the F.C. Marina tied for 1–1 in the aggregate, in the penalty shootout, Acatlán won 4–5 getting its first title in their history. 

Despite winning the promotion to the Liga Premier – Serie A, the team was not certified to participate in the division, so its franchise was relocated to Tepic, Nayarit and was renamed to Coras de Nayarit F.C. In the 2018–2019 season, the Acatlán team remained, but played with the name Futcenter. In 2019, the team returned to its original name officially.

Honors
Tercera División de México (1): 2017–2018

References 

Football clubs in Jalisco
Association football clubs established in 2016
2016 establishments in Mexico